Achthoven is the name of two villages in the province of Utrecht, the Netherlands:

Achthoven, Montfoort
Achthoven, Vijfheerenlanden